The 2017–18 Marist Red Foxes women's basketball team represented Marist College during the 2017–18 NCAA Division I women's basketball season. The Red Foxes, led by sixteenth year head coach Brian Giorgis, play their home games at the McCann Field House and were members of the Metro Atlantic Athletic Conference. They finished the season 20–14, 14–4 in MAAC play to finish in second place. They advanced to the championship game of the MAAC women's tournament where they lost to Quinnipiac. They received an automatic bid to the Women's National Invitation Tournament where they lost to St. John's in the first round.

Roster

Schedule

|-
!colspan=9 style=| Exhibition

|-
!colspan=9 style=| Non-conference regular season

|-
!colspan=9 style=| MAAC Regular season

|-
!colspan=9 style=| MAAC Women's Tournament

|-
!colspan=9 style=| WNIT

See also
 2017–18 Marist Red Foxes men's basketball team

References

Marist Red Foxes women's basketball seasons
Marist
Marist